Efan Daniel (born 14 December 2002) is a Welsh rugby union player, currently playing for United Rugby Championship side Cardiff. His preferred position is hooker.

Cardiff
Daniel was named in the Cardiff academy squad for the 2021–22 season. He made his debut for Cardiff in Round 11 of the 2021–22 United Rugby Championship against , coming on as a replacement.

References

External links
itsrugby.co.uk Profile

2002 births
Living people
Welsh rugby union players
Cardiff Rugby players
Rugby union hookers